Hygrophorus subalpinus, commonly known as the subalpine waxycap, is a species of white snowbank fungus in the family Hygrophoraceae. Found in the mountains of western North America, it is found growing on the ground under conifers, usually near snowbanks.

Description
The cap of H. subalpinus is typically  in diameter, with a convex shape that becomes flattened in age; sometimes it develops a central umbo (a rounded elevation resembling a nipple). The cap is sticky, white, and the cap margin often has fragments of the veil adhering. The flesh is soft, thick and white. The gills, which are attached decurrently to the stipe (running down the length of the stipe), are narrow, packed closely together, and white-colored. A membranous annulus is present, placed low on the stipe.

The mushroom has virtually no taste.

Microscopic characteristics
The spores are white in deposit; microscopically, they are ellipsoid and smooth, with dimensions of 8–10 by 4.5–5 µm. There are no cystidia present in the gills of this species, and clamp connections are present on the hyphae.

Edibility
Hygrophorus subalpinus is said to be edible, but bland. David Arora notes that it "does not have the greatest texture and flavor". One guide recommends it as a substitute for bamboo shoots.

Habitat and distribution
The fruit bodies of H. subalpinus grows in large clusters under conifers, often near snowbanks, and typically at high elevations, such as on mountains. It usually appears after the snow in the area has receded, sometimes growing partly underground. It is found in North America, from the Rocky Mountains to the Pacific Northwest.

Similar species
The external appearance of Hygrophorus ponderatus resembles H. subalpinus, but the former species has a sticky or slimy cap surface, a veil that appears to be made of fibers (rather than a membrane), and narrower gills. Russula brevipes is also similar.

See also
 List of Hygrophorus species

References

External links

Edible fungi
Fungi described in 1941
Fungi of North America
Snowbank fungi
subalpinus